Lerappa ("Apparel" spelled backwards) is the private island that was commissioned by American Apparel in Second Life to emulate the company's real world stores in the real world.  The store was designed by virtual content designer Aimee Weber and was completed and opened in Second Life on June 17 of 2006. American Apparel pulled out of Second Life's virtual arena and closed virtual shop in the fourth quarter of 2007.

Building design

Designer Aimee Weber had designed other projects in Second Life for large clients, with approval of members in the Second Life world.  Lerappa's  two-story company store was modeled after American Apparel's Tokyo showroom, and included some of the controversial advertising campaigns on the walls around the store. The building was constructed in mostly glass and featured lighting that change when the virtual world reaches night time. Outside the store was a stage where live virtual bands can perform.

Merchandising

Official American Apparel clothing, along with planned new lines the company was test marketing, was purchased in virtual form for less than 266 Linden (approximately US$1) and included a discount code usable at the company's real-life online store. 20 of American Apparel's styles were offered initially,  Customers could also purchase real clothing from the company website via the virtual store.

Marketing
Lerappa was intended as an advertising experiment more than a vehicle for electronic commerce. In its first ten days of operation it generated approximately as much revenue as a typical retail location's daily sales.

Virtual protests

Second Life protesters (aka. Second Life Liberation Army) held a protest opposing the company's real world use of sexually suggestive imagery in advertising campaigns.  In February 2007 the virtual location was attacked by "virtual terrorists" via "white balls" which purposely placed in the store to temporarily obstruct areas of the screen.

References

Second Life